Keith A. Knudsen (February 18, 1948 – February 8, 2005) was an American rock drummer, vocalist, and songwriter. Knudsen was best known as a drummer and vocalist for The Doobie Brothers. In addition, he founded the band Southern Pacific with fellow Doobie Brother John McFee. He was posthoumusly inducted into the Rock and Roll Hall of Fame as a member of The Doobie Brothers in 2020.

Biography
Knudsen was born in Le Mars, Iowa. He began drumming while attending Princeton High School in Princeton, Illinois, where he graduated in 1966. After short stints playing in a club band and the Blind Joe Mendlebaum Blues Band, he became the drummer for organist/vocalist Lee Michaels. He played in The Hoodoo Rhythm Devils from late 1972 through mid 1973. He never participated in any formal studio recording with them, but recorded a live Texas Special on KSAN-FM in San Francisco with the Hoodoos and Johnny Winter. His big break came in 1974 when he was invited to join The Doobie Brothers, replacing the departing Michael Hossack. Knudsen joined the band during the recording of the 1974 Top 10 platinum album, What Were Once Vices Are Now Habits. He made his recording debut with the Doobies on that album in 1974, performing backing vocals over instrumental tracks that included Hossack.

Knudsen did not get behind the drum kit in the recording studio until Stampede in 1975. Knudsen was co-drummer with John Hartman, (and later, Chet McCracken) until the Doobies disbanded in 1982. His contribution to the group's vocal harmonies in the studio and in concert was as crucial as his drumming.

After the Doobies disbanded in 1982, Knudsen and fellow Doobie John McFee formed the country rock band Southern Pacific. The group was successful in the country charts but disbanded in the early 1990s. By then the two men had formed a writing partnership and despite not rejoining the group at that time, co-wrote the song Time Is Here And Gone with Doobies' percussionist Bobby LaKind, featured on the Doobies reunion album Cycles in 1989.

Knudsen organized a one-off Doobies reunion in 1987 to raise funds for the National Veterans Foundation. After Southern Pacific folded, both he and McFee rejoined the Doobie Brothers on a full-time basis in 1993. Ironically, Knudsen found himself drumming alongside Michael Hossack, whom he had replaced all those years ago. Of the multiple pairings of Doobie Brothers drummers over the decades, Knudsen's time-keeping partnership with Hossack lasted the longest.

He featured prominently as a songwriter on the album Sibling Rivalry (2000), which was, at the time, only the band's third studio album since reuniting. He also featured on the albums Rockin' Down the Highway: The Wildlife Concert (1996), and Live at Wolf Trap (2004). In 2005 he played drums on Emmylou Harris Shores Of White Sand off the All I Intend To Be record.

Though Knudsen was a frequent backing vocalist for the Doobie Brothers, he did not sing lead on many released Doobies tracks. On "Double Dealin' Four Flusher" (from Stampede) he is heard trading brief lead vocal lines with Pat Simmons and Tom Johnston. (The box set Long Train Runnin': 1970–2000 has an early rehearsal version of this song, called "Shuffle," with vocals only by Simmons and Knudsen.) Knudsen can also be heard singing lead on songs from the 1982 Doobie Brothers Farewell Tour ("Don't Start Me To Talkin'" from Farewell Tour; "Listen To The Music" from the Farewell Tour video and the album Live at the Greek Theater 1982). Sibling Rivalry features two later, and very different sounding, Knudsen lead vocals.

Knudsen died of pneumonia at a rehabilitation hospital in Kentfield, California, at the age of 56. He was living in Sonoma County with his wife, Kate, and his daughter Dayna at the time of his death.

Discography

With the Doobie Brothers (studio albums)
What Were Once Vices Are Now Habits (1974) (US #4)
Stampede (1975) (US #4)
Takin' It to the Streets (1976) (US #8)
Livin' on the Fault Line (1977) (US #10)
Minute by Minute (1978) (US #1)
One Step Closer (1980) (US #3)
Sibling Rivalry (2000)

With Southern Pacific
Southern Pacific (1985)
Killbilly Hill (1986)
Zuma (1988)
County Line (1989)

References

External links 

1948 births
2005 deaths
American rock drummers
Songwriters from Iowa
The Doobie Brothers members
People from Le Mars, Iowa
Southern Pacific (band) members
American people of Norwegian descent
Deaths from pneumonia in California
20th-century American singers
20th-century American drummers
American male drummers
Singers from Iowa
20th-century American male singers